Michele Reinhart is an American politician who was a Democratic Party member of the Montana House of Representatives, representing District 97 from 2007 to 2012. Her political views at that time included:
Pro-choice
Tax credits for the use of biodiesel
Country of origin labeling for food

She was a community organizer and citizen lobbyist for Northern Plains Resource Council, a Billings Montana environmental organization, from 2003 to 2005. She was a member of the Montana state legislature from 2007 to 2012 and was the youngest woman serving at that time when elected.

References

External links
Representative Michele Reinhart official website
Montana House of Representatives - Michele Reinhart official MT State Legislature website
Project Vote Smart - Representative Michele Reinhart (MT) profile
 2006 campaign contributions at Followthemoney.org
2008 campaign contributions at Followthemoney.org

Democratic Party members of the Montana House of Representatives
Living people
Women state legislators in Montana
Carroll College (Montana) alumni
University of Montana alumni
People from Livingston, Montana
Year of birth missing (living people)
21st-century American women